Birds of Paradise (translit. Rayskie ptitsy) is a 2008 Ukrainian drama film directed by Roman Balayan. It was entered into the 30th Moscow International Film Festival.

Plot 
The film takes place in the USSR in the early 1980s. Mass persecutions seem to be in the past, but listening to foreign radio stations is still prohibited, and it is dangerous to express one's thoughts in the presence of outsiders. Every knock on the door still makes me shudder. Words of truth sound only in kitchens, behind curtained windows, and make their way in typewritten books - "self-published". They are passed quietly, slowly, only to verified friends, fearing persecution. The main characters have to oppose the inhuman state machine, put their lives on the path to true freedom.  Nobody and nothing can stop a person.

Cast
 Oksana Akinshina
 Andriy Kuzychiev
 Oleg Yankovskiy
 Yehor Pazenko
 Serhiy Romaniuk
 Serhiy Siplivy
 Alla Sergiyko as Grandmother

References

External links
 
 
 

2008 films
2008 drama films
2000s Russian-language films
Ukrainian-language films
Films directed by Roman Balayan
Ukrainian drama films